In enzymology, a glutathionylspermidine synthase is an enzyme that catalyzes the chemical reaction

glutathione + spermidine + ATP  glutathionylspermidine + ADP + phosphate

The 3 substrates of this enzyme are glutathione, spermidine, and ATP, whereas its 3 products are glutathionylspermidine, ADP, and phosphate.

This enzyme belongs to the family of ligases, specifically those forming carbon-nitrogen bonds as acid-D-ammonia (or amine) ligases (amide synthases).  The systematic name of this enzyme class is gamma-L-glutamyl-L-cysteinyl-glycine:spermidine ligase (ADP-forming) [spermidine is numbered so that atom N-1 is in the amino group of the aminopropyl part of the molecule]. This enzyme is also called glutathione:spermidine ligase (ADP-forming).  This enzyme participates in glutathione metabolism.  It employs one cofactor, magnesium.

Structural studies

References

 
 

EC 6.3.1
Magnesium enzymes
Enzymes of known structure